T. K. Oommen (in full Tharailath Koshy Oommen) is an Indian sociologist, author, teacher, and Professor Emeritus at the Centre for the Study of Social Systems, Jawaharlal Nehru University. He was awarded Padma Bhushan, the third highest Indian civilian award in 2008   for his services to the fields of education and literature by the President of India.

He was the 12th president of International Sociological Association (1990–1994).

Biography
T. K. Oommen was born on 16 October 1937 as the second male child to Saramma and Koshy of the Keerikattu family at Tharailath, Venmony, Alleppey, Travancore. After early schooling in Alappuzha, Oommen obtained his BA in economics from Kerala University, Thiruvananthapuram in 1957 and MA in sociology from Pune University in 1960. He continued at Pune University for his doctoral research and obtained PhD in 1965 on Charisma, stability and change: an analysis of Bhoodan-Gramdan movement in India under the supervision of Prof. Y. B. Damle.

He currently resides at National Media Campus, Gurgaon in Haryana.

Career
Oommen started his career as a lecturer in Social Sciences at Delhi School of Social Work, Delhi University (1964–70) where he worked as the Reader in Sociology (1970–71). He then moved to the Centre for the Study of Social Systems (CSSS), Jawaharlal Nehru University as Associate Professor (1971–76) and later became the Professor of Sociology (1976–2002).

During 2003–2006, he was involved with the following projects:
 He was the Chairman of the Advisory Committee, Gujarat Harmony Project, to explore the possibility of reconciliation between Hindus and Muslims after the 2002 communal carnage in Gujarat.
 He was a member of the Prime Minister's High Level Committee, to study the Social, Economic and Educational Status of the Muslim Community of India, popularly known as the Sachar Committee.
 He held the Chairmanship of Ford Foundation on Non-traditional Security.

In 2007, he was made Professor Emeritus at Jawaharlal Nehru University.

Positions held
T. K. Oommen held various positions at International Sociological Association during the period 1986 to 1994.
 1986 Secretary General, XI World Congress of Sociology, New Delhi
 1986–90 EC member
 1990–94 President (He was only person from Asia and Africa to hold the post)

He also held other positions during his career:
 Treasurer, Indian Sociological Society,  1975–78.
 Secretary, Indian Sociological Society, 1989–91.
 Editor, Sociological Bulletin, official organ of the Indian Sociological Society, 1975–8, 1989–1991, 1998–1999.
 President, Indian Sociological Society, 1998–99.
 Member, board of directors, International Institute of Sociology, Rome, 2001–2005.
 Council Member, International Association for the Scientific Study of Religion, 1989–91 and 1993–95.
 Vice-chair, Church and Society, World Council of Churches, Geneva, 1984–89.
 Member, Indian National Commission for UNESCO, 1993–97.

He was also U.G.C. National Lecturer in Sociology, 1985–86, visiting professor, Dept. of Sociology, University of California (Berkeley), USA., Fall, 1990, visiting professor, Maison des Sciences de L'homme, Paris, June–July 1992, visiting professor, Wissenshaftszentrum, Berlin, May–July 1993 and June 1994, visiting fellow, Research School of Social Science, Australian National University, Canberra, December 1993 and senior visiting fellow, Institute of Advanced Studies, Budapest, October 1994 – July 1995.

Awards and recognitions
Oommen received many awards for his services to the social milieu.
 V. K. R. V. Rao Prize in Sociology for 1981 by the Indian Council of Social Science Research
 G. S. Ghurye Award for 1985 by Bombay University, Mumbai
 Swami Pranavananda Award in Sociology, 1997 by University Grants Commission, New Delhi, India.
 Fellow, the Swedish Collegium for Advanced Study in the Social Sciences, Uppsala, Sweden January–June 1998.
 Philipose Mar Chrysostom Navathy Award for Excellence, 2007.
 Padma Bhushan by the President of India in 2008

Books and publications

References

External links
 Full text of the interview with T. K. Oommen
 Profile on ISA web site
 Profile on Pearson
 on Amazon
 Reference
 Interview on Social Theory Research Network
 on Catholic Bishops Conference of India
 on WorldCat

Further reading
 
 
 
 
 
 
 
 

1937 births
Living people
Indian political writers
Writers from Kerala
Recipients of the Padma Bhushan in literature & education
People from Alappuzha district
Indian sociologists
Scientists from Kerala
Indian social sciences writers
20th-century Indian educational theorists
20th-century Indian non-fiction writers
Presidents of the International Sociological Association